The 1980–81 Macedonian Republic League was the 37th since its establishment. FK Pobeda won their 5th  championship title.

Participating teams

Final table

External links
SportSport.ba
Football Federation of Macedonia 

Macedonian Football League seasons
Yugo
3